The Youth for Egypt Party is a political party that is made up of former members of the Egyptian Muslim Brotherhood. The coordinator of the Brotherhood Youth Alliance, Amr Emara, has requested a meeting with the Salafi Nour Party to ask that the Salafi party forms an alliance with it. The Nour Party will instead ally with the 38 Copts Initiative.

References

Islamic political parties in Egypt
Political parties in Egypt
Political parties with year of establishment missing